Ptychella is a genus of fungi in the Bolbitiaceae family of mushrooms. This is a monotypic genus, containing the single species Ptychella ochracea.

External links
 Ptychella at Index Fungorum

Bolbitiaceae
Monotypic Agaricales genera